Son of India is a Bollywood film released in 1962. This film was written and directed by Mehboob Khan, starring Sajid Khan, Kamaljit, Simi Garewal, Jayant and Kumkum. The music was composed by Naushad and with Shakeel Badayuni as the lyricist. It was a spiritual successor to Mehboob Khan's previous film, Mother India (1957).

This movie's soundtrack consisted of some iconic Bollywood songs including the popular patriotic song titled "Nanha Munna Rahi Hoon Desh Ka Sipahi Hoon". The film was a box office bomb.

Cast
Sajid Khan
Kamaljit as Kishore
Simi Garewal as Lalita
Kumkum as Kamla
Jayant as Jung 'JB' Bahadur
Ruby Mayers as Paro
Kanhaiyalal as Paro's father
Tun Tun as Gopal's foster mother
Durga Khote as Head Nun
Murad as Judge
Mukri	
Bakhtawar Singh
Kumar				
Lilian

Box office

Soundtrack

The soundtrack for the movie was composed by Naushad and lyrics penned by Shakeel Badayuni. The soundtrack consists of 9 songs, featuring vocals by Mohammed Rafi, Lata Mangeshkar, Geeta Dutt and Shanthi Mathur.

See also
 Mother India

References

External links
 
 Son of India songs

1962 films
1960s Hindi-language films
Films directed by Mehboob Khan
Films scored by Naushad